Prince Reza Pahlavi (born 31 October 1960) is the oldest son of Mohammad Reza Pahlavi, the last Shah of Iran, and his wife Farah Diba. Before the Islamic Revolution in 1979, he was the crown prince and the last heir apparent to the throne of the Imperial State of Iran. Today, Pahlavi resides in Great Falls, Virginia.

Pahlavi is the founder and leader of the self-styled National Council of Iran, an exiled opposition group, participates in the Iranian democracy movement, and is a prominent critic of Iran's Islamic Republic government.

Early life and education 

Reza Pahlavi was born in Tehran as the eldest son of Mohammad Reza Pahlavi, the Shah of Iran and Farah Pahlavi, the Shahbanu of Iran. Pahlavi's siblings include his sister Princess Farahnaz Pahlavi (born 1963), brother Prince Ali Reza Pahlavi (1966–2011), and sister Princess Leila Pahlavi (1970–2001), as well as a half-sister, Princess Shahnaz Pahlavi (born 1940).

When he was born, the Shah pardoned 98 political prisoners and the government declared a 20% reduction in income tax. He studied at the eponymous "Reza Pahlavi School", a private school located in the royal palace and restricted to the imperial family and court associates. He was trained as a pilot; his first solo flight was at the age of 11, and he obtained his license a year later. He was a supporter of Taj Abadan football club.

As a cadet of the Imperial Iranian Air Force, he was sent to the United States in August 1978 to continue his pilot training, and was one of 43 cadet pilots in the one-year pilot training program at the former Reese Air Force Base, TX, which included flying the Cessna T-37 Tweet and Northrop T-38 Talon. As a result of the Iranian Revolution, he left the base in March 1979, about four months earlier than planned.

Pahlavi began studies at Williams College in September 1979, but dropped out in 1980. He then enrolled at The American University in Cairo as a political science student, but his attendance was irregular. In 1981, it was reported that he had dropped out of the program and continued his studies privately with Iranian professors, with a focus on Persian culture and history, Islamic philosophy, and oil in Iran.

Pahlavi obtained a BSc degree in political science by correspondence from the University of Southern California in 1985. He is fluent in English and French in addition to his native Persian.

Political activities in exile

Reza Pahlavi came to Cairo, Egypt, in March 1980 with his family. When his father Mohammad Reza Pahlavi was ill and in the last weeks of his life, media reported that some monarchist elements had advised the Shah to oust Reza in favor of his younger son Ali Reza (who was 13 at the time) and a regency council, suggesting that Reza's background, training and interest in public affairs was too limited to become his successor. The Shah was understood to have rejected the idea, as well as to abdicate himself in favor of one of his two sons. When the Shah died on 27 July 1980, Farah Pahlavi proclaimed herself as the regent, a title in pretense. On his 20th birthday on 31 October, Reza Pahlavi declared himself to be the new king of Iran, Reza Shah II, and the rightful successor to the throne of Pahlavi dynasty. Immediately afterwards a spokesman for the United States Department of State, John Trattner, disassociated the U.S. government from Reza Pahlavi by stating that his government did not intend to support him, assuring that they recognized the Iranian government.

During 1981, Pahlavi remained in the Koubbeh Palace and developed close ties to pro-monarchy groups while facing rejection from other opposition groups, including left-wing dissidents. In March, he issued a statement for the Persian New Year and urged all opponents of the Iranian government unite behind him and wage a "national resistance", but chose to remain silent and made no reaction when President Abolhassan Banisadr was deposed and the assassination of tens of officials including Chief Justice Mohammad Beheshti took place in June. In August, Pahlavi announced that he had been secretly planning to overthrow the Iranian government, stating "So far I have been unwilling to unveil the existence of the concerted plans for I do not wish to jeopardize the lives of some of our best children... many of our actions have been unknown to you, but I want to assure you that the necessary steps are being taken in the best orderly way to save Iran".

In 1982, Yaakov Nimrodi told BBC in a radio interview that along with Adolph Schwimmer and Adnan Khashoggi, he was involved with Pahlavi and Gen. Said Razvani to scheme a coup d'état and install him in Iran. According to Samuel Segev, the plan had the approval of both the CIA and the Israeli cabinet but it was abandoned when Menachem Begin resigned in 1983 and the new leadership "thought Israel should not be involved in a new adventure".

On 1 May 1986, Pahlavi disclosed that he had recently formed a government-in-exile with an aim to establish a constitutional monarchy once again in Iran.

On his website, Pahlavi has said that the state of Iran should become democratic and secular, and human rights should be respected. Whether the form of government would be that of a constitutional monarchy or a republic is something that he would like to leave up to the people of Iran.

Pahlavi has used his high profile as an Iranian abroad to campaign for human rights, democracy and unity among Iranians in and outside Iran. On his website he calls for a separation of religion and state in Iran and for free and fair elections "for all freedom-loving individuals and political ideologies". He exhorts all groups dedicated to a democratic agenda to work together for a democratic and secular Iranian government.

In February 2011, after violence erupted in Tehran, Pahlavi said that Iran's youth were determined to get rid of an authoritarian government tainted by corruption and misrule in the hope of installing a democracy. "Fundamental and necessary change is long overdue for our region and we have a whole generation of young Egyptians and Iranians not willing to take no for an answer", he told The Daily Telegraph. "Democratization is now an imperative that cannot be denied. It is only a matter of time before the whole region can transform itself."

In June 2018, he made this comment: "I believe Iran must be a secular, parliamentary democracy. The final form has to be decided by the people." In a presentation at the Washington Institute for Near East Policy in December 2018, Pahlavi called for non-military support of those in Iran who were trying to replace the Islamist regime with a secular democracy. According to a news report, he was "not openly calling for the restoration of the Peacock Throne ... He casts himself more as a symbol than a politician, but has called himself 'ready to serve my country'".

Succession
Reza Pahlavi II is first in the line of succession to his late father, while his younger brother Ali-Reza Pahlavi II was second in line until he committed suicide in 2011. Prior to his birth, the presumptive heir was Patrick Ali Pahlavi, the crown prince's cousin.

In February 2019, he launched an initiative called the Phoenix Project of Iran. According to the National Interest, this is "designed to bring the various strains of the opposition closer to a common vision for a post-clerical Iran".

Within Iran 
A report published by the Brookings Institution in 2009 said that Pahlavi lacked an organized following within Iran since there was no serious monarchist movement in Iran itself. The report described Pahlavi as having "little in common with the intellectuals and students who make up the core of the reform movement".

During 2017–18 Iranian protests, some videos on social media showed demonstrators chanting slogans in favor of Pahlavi's grandfather and calling for his return. On many occasions the videos indicated the royalist slogans prompts others in the crowd to shout the slogans down.

Among Iranian expatriates 
Pahlavi enjoys wide popularity with the older generation of Iranian expatriates that left Iran at the time of the 1979 revolution and with some people in Iran. In 2006, Connie Bruck of The New Yorker wrote that Los Angeles is home to about 600,000 Iranian expatriates, and said it was a monarchist stronghold.

A 2013 survey of Iranian-Americans conducted by George Mason University's Center for Social Science Research found that 85% of respondents did not support any Iranian opposition groups or figures. Of the remaining 15% who expressed support, 20% backed him.

Support during the Mahsa Amini protests 
In a recent attempt in 2023 to garner support for Reza Pahlavi, as a representative for transition, a petition was created on the platform Change.org that has amassed over 160,000 signatures.

Reza Pahlavi asked Iranians around the world to protest against Islamic Republic on its 44th anniversary, February 11, 2023. As a result, people rallied in multiple cities in the US, Europe, Australia and Canada. Reza Pahlavi himself participated in LA rally where a massive crowd of more than 80,000 showed up.

Foreign support
Bob Woodward wrote in 1986 that the Reagan administration authorized the Central Intelligence Agency (CIA) to support and fund Iranian exiles, including Pahlavi. The agency transmitted his 11-minute speech during which he vowed "I will return" to Iranian television by pirating its frequency. The Tower Commission report, published in 1987, also acknowledged that the CIA was behind this event while a group in Paris calling itself 'Flag of Freedom' had taken responsibility for the act in September 1986.

James Mann wrote in February 1989 that when he asked the CIA about whether they help Pahlavi, they refused to comment and a spokesperson of the agency told him "We would not confirm nor deny an intelligence matter".

In 2006, Connie Bruck of The New Yorker wrote that "Pahlavi had CIA funding for a number of years in the eighties, but it ended after the Iran-Contra scandal". Andrew Friedman of Haverford College states that Pahlavi began cooperation with the CIA after he met director William J. Casey and received a monthly stipend, citing Pahlavi's financial advisor and other observers. Friedman also connects his residence in Great Falls, Virginia to its proximity to George Bush Center for Intelligence, headquarters of the service.

In 2009, Pahlavi denied receiving U.S. government aid or any foreign aid in an interview with The New York Times. Pahlavi said "No, no. I don't rely on any sources other than my own compatriots" and denied allegations of working with the CIA, calling the allegations "absolutely and unequivocally false". However, in 2017 he told Jon Gambrell of the Associated Press: "My focus right now is on liberating Iran, and I will find any means that I can, without compromising the national interests and independence, with anyone who is willing to give us a hand, whether it is the U.S. or the Saudis or the Israelis or whomever it is."

Personal life

Relationships and marriage 
According to a People article published in 1978, Pahlavi dated a "blond, blue-eyed Swedish model he met in Rome". The same publication also reported that he lived with his girlfriend while living in Lubbock, Texas. As of 1980, he had an Egyptian girlfriend who was a student of The American University in Cairo, reportedly "closely guarded" by bodyguards.

Pahlavi began a relationship with Yasmine Etemad-Amini in 1985, and a year later married her, then aged 17, at 25 years of age. The couple have three daughters: Noor (born 3 April 1992), Iman (born 12 September 1993), and Farah (born 17 January 2004).

In 2004, Pahlavi was named as the "unofficial godfather" of Princess Louise of Belgium, the eighth granddaughter of King Albert II of Belgium.

Hobbies 
Pahlavi was a keen football player and spectator. He was fan of the capital's football club Esteghlal, then known as Taj and his support was even televised by the National Iranian Radio and Television. The club performed in annual rallies organized on his birthday, which as a result identified the club with the Pahlavi regime.

In 1981, UPI reported that Pahlavi attended the elite Gueziro Club in Cairo to watch tennis and was occasionally seen in discotheques at hotels in the vicinity of the Nile.

Religious beliefs 
When interviewed about religion, Pahlavi said, "That's a private matter; but if you must know, I am, of course, by education and by conviction, a Shia Muslim. I am very much a man of faith." Iranian writer Reza Bayegan also notes that Crown Prince Reza is allegedly "deeply attached" to his Muslim faith. He has performed the Hajj (pilgrimage) to Mecca.

Financial and legal issues

Occupation 
In 1989, The Washington Post reported that Pahlavi was unemployed. Asked about his sources of income, he replied that he had been financially supported by "friends and family" in the past seven years. In 2017, he told the Associated Press that since 1979 he had had no "side occupation" (with regard to political activities), adding that his money came from his family and "many Iranians who have supported the cause". According to a December 2018 news report by Politico, "he is thought to live mainly on what's left of his family wealth, his only full-time job being speaking out about Iran".

Shahbazi v. Pahlavi 
In 1990, Ali Haydar Shahbazi, a former Imperial Guard member who worked for Pahlavi as a longtime bodyguard filed a lawsuit in the district court of Alexandria, Virginia, accusing Pahlavi of breaching Iranian tradition by breaking his pledge to take care of him financially. Shahbazi, then aged 58, said in the court he abandoned more than $400,000 in property in Iran because Pahlavi assured him "I'm going to pay your expenses and everything. I'm going to take care of you better than my father [did]" when he was hired, and then fired him with a handshake and $9,000 in 1989. Shahbazi asked compensation for the $30,000 in taxes and penalties as well as an undetermined amount of money for his retirement. Pahlavi's attorney dismissed the claim, saying that Shahbazi has received gifts worth several thousand dollars and was allowed to live luxuriously in Pahlavi's house in Great Falls, Virginia, adding that the servant was fired because his client ran out of money. Pahlavi agreed that Shahbazi was a loyal friend but he offered support as long as he could. He also told the judge "I was not involved in the day-to-day handling of my financial affairs".

In 1991, District Judge Albert Vickers Bryan Jr. argued that Pahlavi "had little knowledge of how his estate's money was spent and could not be held personally accountable for employment agreements with servants", declaring the case dismissed. According to media reports, Pahlavi began to cry in the court when the judge threw out the case.

Ansari v. Pahlavi 
In 1990, Pahlavi and Ahmad Ali Massoud Ansari, his close aide and financial adviser, filed lawsuits against each other. Pahlavi accused Ansari of embezzlement amounting $24 million, while Ansari claimed $1.7 million lien against Pahlavi. During the trial, Pahlavi's attorney told the court "[d]ue to the demands of his political responsibilities and his lack of experience in financial matters, Pahlavi had to trust completely in Ansari for the management of his funds... over the years, no one supplanted Ansari in any way in Pahlavi's trust. Conversely, no one betrayed Pahlavi's trust any more than Ansari", going further to accuse Ansari as "an agent" for the Islamic Republic of Iran. Ansari denied the accusations and blamed Pahlavi for squandering the money with his extravagance, stating he faithfully carried out orders that Pahlavi was aware of.

The court asked Ansari to provide a complete accounting of his handling of the money, but he alleged that the documents have been destroyed to prevent a potential seizure. In 1996, the court ruled that Ansari should repay $7.3 million to Pahlavi and fined him an additional $2 million.

Television network 
In November 2014, Pahlavi founded his own television and radio network called Ofogh Iran; in July 2017 it was reported that the Ofogh Iran International Media telethon no longer belonged to Pahlavi.

Bibliography
Gozashteh va Ayandeh, London: Kayham Publishing, 2000. (in Persian)
Winds of Change: The Future of Democracy in Iran, Regnery Publishing Inc., 2002, .
Iran: L'Heure du Choix, Denoël, 2009. (in French)

Honours

National 
  Sovereign Knight Grand Cordon with Collar of the Order of Pahlavi (26 September 1967, Iran)
  Mohammad Rezā Shāh Pahlavi Coronation Medal (26 October 1967, Iran)
  25th Centennial Anniversary Medal (14 October 1971, Iran)
  Persepolis Medal (15 October 1971, Iran)

Foreign 
  Knight of the Royal Order of the Seraphim (24 November 1970, Sweden)
  Knight Grand Cross of the Order of Merit of the Italian Republic (15 December 1974, Italy)
  Collar of the Order of Isabella the Catholic (19 April 1975, Spain)
  Grand Cross of the Legion of Honour (14 December 1976, France)
  Grand Star of the Decoration of Honour for Services to the Republic of Austria (1976, Austria)
  Grand Collar of the Royal Order of the Drum (Rwanda)
 : Knight of the Order of Muhammad

Other recognitions 
 Radio Farda's Person of The Year online poll (2011)
 Key to the City of Beverly Hills (23 January 2017, Los Angeles, California)

References

External links

Reza Pahlavi's website

|-

|-

 
|-

People of Pahlavi Iran
1960 births
Living people
Williams College alumni
Iranian dissidents
Iranian anti-communists
Critics of Islamism
Iranian democracy activists
Iranian emigrants to the United States
Iranian royalty
Mohammad Reza Pahlavi
People from Potomac, Maryland
People from Tehran
University of Southern California alumni
Heirs apparent who never acceded
Iranian monarchists
Iranian secularists
Pahlavi pretenders to the Iranian throne
20th-century Iranian writers
21st-century Iranian writers

Knights Grand Cross of the Order of Merit of the Italian Republic
Collars of the Order of Isabella the Catholic
Recipients of the Grand Star of the Decoration for Services to the Republic of Austria
Exiles of the Iranian Revolution in the United States
Exiles of the Iranian Revolution in Egypt
Exiles of the Iranian Revolution in Morocco
Exiles of the Iranian Revolution in Panama
Exiles of the Iranian Revolution in Mexico
Exiles of the Iranian Revolution in the Bahamas
Mazandarani people
People from Great Falls, Virginia
People from Bethesda, Maryland